Deidre A. Hunter is an American astronomer at Lowell Observatory.  Her primary research area is tiny irregular galaxies — their origins, evolution and star production, and the shapes that are formed.  She uses many parts of the electromagnetic spectrum, and includes spectroscopy in her approach.

Education
Hunter's BS is from the University of Arizona (1975) and her PhD in astronomy from the  University of Illinois in 1982. Her thesis was on the star-forming properties of irregular galaxies.  It earned an award from the Astronomical Society of the Pacific.

Career
Hunter was a  postdoctoral fellow at Kitt Peak National Observatory and the Department of Terrestrial Magnetism of the Carnegie Institution of Washington.  She joined Lowell Observatory in 1986.  Hunter ran Lowell’s Native Americans Astronomy Outreach Program for 25 years, sharing astronomy with 4th-8th grade Navajo and Hopi teachers and their classes.

Awards and honors
 Robert J. Trumpler Award for her thesis
 American Astronomical Society’s 2014 Education Prize, partly for her involvement with Lowell's outreach program.
 Elected a Legacy Fellow of the American Astronomical Society in 2020.

Research

See also
 Dwarf galaxies

References

External links
 LITTLE Things publications

Year of birth missing (living people)
Living people
20th-century American women scientists
20th-century American  astronomers
21st-century American women scientists
21st-century American  astronomers
University of Arizona alumni
University of Illinois alumni
Fellows of the American Astronomical Society